Lellig is a village in the commune of Manternach, in eastern Luxembourg.  , the village had a population of 132.

Manternach
Villages in Luxembourg